Tee Harbor (also known as The Harbor) refers to two adjacent populated places in the City and Borough of Juneau, Alaska. The area had a population of 32 in 1950.

Business in the area began with a saltery in 1901 and a cannery in 1911; the cannery burnt down in 1912, according to a 1957 publication by R. N. DeArmond.

The name was published in Polk's Gazetteer in 1916.

Demographics

Tee Harbor first appeared on the 1940 and 1950 U.S. Census as an unincorporated village. It was later annexed into Juneau.

See also
Lena Beach, Alaska

References

Populated coastal places in Alaska on the Pacific Ocean
Populated places established in 1901
Populated places in Juneau, Alaska